Bishop Magnus I, or Mauno, was the Roman Catholic Bishop of Turku between 1291 and 1308. He was the first bishop who is known to have been born in Finland.  He also helped to complete the Christianization of Finland started by St. Henry.

In 1300, Bishop Magnus translated the relics of St. Henry during a period of consolidation of religious and secular power in Medieval Northern Europe.

References

Roman Catholic bishops of Turku
13th-century Roman Catholic bishops in Sweden
14th-century Roman Catholic bishops in Sweden